Kamenče is a small settlement in the Municipality of Braslovče in northern Slovenia. It lies just east of Lake Žovnek. The area is part of the traditional region of Styria. The Municipality of Braslovče is now included in the Savinja Statistical Region.

References

External links
Kamenče on Geopedia

Populated places in the Municipality of Braslovče